Astragon was a town of ancient Caria in the territory of Stratonicea. It was a point of contest between the Rhodians and Macedonians in their war.
 
Its site is tentatively located near Elmacık, Asiatic Turkey.

References

Populated places in ancient Caria
Former populated places in Turkey